Crucible tongs are scissor-like tools, but instead of having two blades, these tools are replaced with two pincers or pieces of metals that concave together, which allow the users to grasp a hot crucibles, flasks, evaporating dishes, or even small beakers. They are made of durable metals, allowing them to endure a very hot temperature when touching with the hot objects.

Crucible 
A laboratory tool that is best fit with crucible tongs is a crucible, a small vessel made from ceramic. Its function is it is used to heat various type of chemicals that are required a very high temperature, usually solid chemicals. This tool is available in various size and form. It can be in a low form or a high form, depends on the types of work. In addition, this vessel can cope with a high temperature up to 565.56 degree Celsius.

Feature 
As a crucible will be very hot when heating it in a furnace or a Bunsen burner, one cannot hold the crucible directly. Therefore, crucible tongs come to play a key role when burning, or doing anything with hot objects. The major types of metals used to produce the tongs are stainless steel, brass, and nickel. Moreover, some of them also have a special characteristic. For instance, a locking version of crucible tongs can be locked with the edge of a crucible, allow users to be more comfortable and more confidence while moving a very hot crucible from place to place. Hence, they provide more safety for the users.

Safety 
It is necessary to wear safety goggles, gloves, and proper shoes as well, crucible tongs is not the only safety tool that one should take when holding a hot crucible. The scorching objects in crucible might be spilled off and cause a damage to a holder's skin. Since crucible tongs work with the crucible, knowing the safety use of crucible is a must. Here are some tips:
 Before using the crucible, make sure that it is dry
 Fill the crucible with sample chemicals to only 1/2 or 2/3, do not fill until it is full
 If the user used the crucible to fuse the glass, waiting for the crucible to cool down before cleaning it 
 Squeezing the crucible or use some metal sticks to break the cooling glass out of the crucible
 Wash it until it is clean enough

Additional images

References 

Laboratory equipment